Dr William James O'Donovan OBE (1886 – 13 January 1955) was a British dermatologist and Conservative Party politician.

Born in Tonbridge, Kent, he was the son of Patrick O'Donovan from Clonakilty, County Cork, Ireland and his wife Beatrice née Gibson of Eynsford. He was educated at the University of London and abroad.

He began his medical career as a registrar at the London Hospital, and became a well-known figure in the East End of London. He went to become a Consulting Physician in skin departments in a number of hospitals in the capital, and served a president of the Dermatological Section of the British Medical Association.

Politically a Conservative, from 1931 to 1935 he was Member of Parliament (MP) for Mile End. He attempted to return to the Commons at the 1950 general election, unsuccessfully contesting Fulham West.

An active Roman Catholic, he was awarded the papal Order of St. Gregory the Great. He was also awarded the Order of the British Empire.

References

External links 

1886 births
1955 deaths
Conservative Party (UK) MPs for English constituencies
English people of Irish descent
UK MPs 1931–1935
British dermatologists
Knights of St. Gregory the Great
People from Tonbridge